These are the results for the mixed BMX freestyle park event at the 2018 Summer Youth Olympics.

Results

Women

Seeding

Qualification

Finals

Men

Seeding

Qualification

Finals

Team classification

References

Cycling at the 2018 Summer Youth Olympics